Chaleumpol Tikumpornteerawong or Jack (born 13 June 1989) is an actor from Muak Lek, Saraburi Province, Thailand. He graduated from Rangsit University.

Discography

Film 
 Why want to commerdian /ทำไมต้องเป็นตลก (2001)
 Fan Chan (2003)
 Dek Den / เด็กเดน (2005)
 เด็กหอ (2006)
 Seasons Change (2006)
 Lucky Loser (2006)
 The Possible (2006)
 Ma-Mha  (2007)
 Hormones (2008)
 Friendship (2008)
 Best of Times (2009)
 Bangkok Traffic Love Story (2009)
 ATM: Er Rak Error (2012)
 Seven Something (2012)
 Brother Of The Year (2018 film) (2018)

Television dramas 
 Kru Wai Jai Rai / ครูไหวใจร้าย 
 Butterfly and Flowers
 Game Rai Game Rak
 Torranee Ni Nee Krai Krong 
 Ab Ruk Online
 2009 Ruk Nee Kiang Tawan (รักนี้เคียงตะวัน) (MEDIA OFF MEDIA/Ch.7) as 
 2009 Fai Shone Sang (ไฟโชนแสง) (Good Feeling/Ch.3) as Lo' (หล่อ) 
 2010 Butterfly and Flowers (ผีเสื้อและดอกไม้) (/Thai PBS) as (อาเดล)
 2010 Seub Suan Puan Ruk (2010) (สืบสวนป่วนรัก) (GEINOKAI/Ch.3) as (เอกมันต์ (รับเชิญ))
 2011 Som Waan Namtarn Priew (ส้มหวานน้ำตาลเปรี้ยว) (MEDIA OFF MEDIA/Ch.7) as Thongchai (Tou) (ธงชัย (ตือ))
 2011 Hor Heu Heu (หอ หึ หึ) (MAKER K/Ch.3) as Boriboon (บริบูรณ์) 
 2011 Suepsuan Puan Kamlang 3 (สืบสวนป่วนกำลังสาม) (GEINOKAI/Ch.3) as (เอกมันต์) 
 2011 Game Rai Game Rak (เกมร้ายเกมรัก) (Lakornthai/Ch.3) as Taeloy (แตลอย (ลอย))
 2012 Meu Prab Por Look Orn (มือปราบพ่อลูกอ่อน) (Cholumpi Production/Ch.3) as (ปาล์ม) 
 2012 Torranee Ni Nee Krai Krong (ธรณีนี่นี้ใครครอง) (No Problem/Ch.3) as Aueng (อึ่ง) 
 2012 Manee Dan Suaang (มณีแดนสรวง) (Broadcast Thai​ Television/Ch.3) as (จิตราสูร)
 2012 Panyachon Kon Krua (ปัญญาชนก้นครัว) (Thong Entertainment/Ch.3) as Wan (แว่น)
 2012 Jao Mae Jum Pen (เจ้าแม่จำเป็น) (Exact-Scenario/Ch.5) as Koy (ก๋อย)
 2013 Khun Chai Taratorn (สุภาพบุรุษจุฑาเทพ ตอน คุณชายธราธร) (Maker Y Group/Ch.3) as Udom (อุดม)
 2013 Dao Raung (ดาวเรือง) (Feel Good Entertainment/Ch.3) as (แหลม)
 2013 Peak Marn (ปีกมาร) (Exact-Scenario/Ch.5) as Phaluk (ผลึก)
 2014 Kularb Rai Kong Naai Tawan (กุหลาบร้ายของนายตะวัน) (Polyplus Entertainment/Ch.7) as Yae (แย้)
 2015 Ab Ruk Online (แอบรักออนไลน์) (Thong Entertainment/Ch.3) as Sahus (สหัส (รับเชิญ))
 2015 Baan Sao Sila Hua Dang (บ้านศิลาแดง) (Polyplus Entertainment/Ch.7) as Golf (กอล์ฟ)
 2016 Piang Chai Kon Nee Mai Chai Poo Wised (เพียงชายคนนี้ไม่ใช่ผู้วิเศษ) (Thong Entertainment/Ch.3) as A-Sao (แอเซาะ (รับเชิญ)) with Wiragarn Seneetunti
 2016 Raeng Tawan (แรงตะวัน) (LOVE DRAMA/Ch.3) as Seur Krohng (เสือโคร่ง) 
 2016 Butsaba Na Talat (บุษบาหน้าตลาด) (Step Aonvert/Ch.3) as Dung (ดุ้ง)
 2017 Lah (ล่า) (The One Enterprise/One 31) as Man (อรรถพล เก่งเมือง (แมน)) 
 2018 Khun Chai Kai Tong (คุณชายไก่โต้ง) (Polyplus Entertainment/Ch.7) as Pong (ป๋อง)
 2018 Pan Ta Gaan Ruk (พันธกานต์รัก) (Prakotkarndee/Ch.7) as Max (แม็กซ์)
 2018 Mee Piang Rak (มีเพียงรัก Secret Moon) (/Ch.3) as Jitrit (จิ๊ดริ๊ด)
 2019 Tukta Phee (ตุ๊กตาผี) (Kantana Group/Ch.3) as Moo Tun (หมูตุ๋น)
 2019 Kaew Klang Dong (แก้วกลางดง) (/Ch.3) as Fah Lan (ฟ้าลั่น)
 2019 My Love From Another Star (ลิขิตรักข้ามดวงดาว) (Broadcast Thai​ Television/Ch.3) as Chong (ช่อง (รับเชิญ))
 2019 Jun Krajang Tee Klang Thung (จันทร์กระจ่างที่กลางทุ่ง) (/Ch.7) as Dam (ดำ)
 2020 Trab Fah Mee Tawan (ตราบฟ้ามีตะวัน) (Sonix Boom 2013/Ch.3) as Saeb (แสบ)
 2021 Kaen Kaew (แก่นแก้ว) (Family Plus/Ch.3) as Perng (เปิง) 
 2022 Sarb Sorn Ruk (สาปซ่อนรัก) (TV Scene & Picture/Ch.3) as Marut Phanpum (Boem) (มารุต พันธ์พุ่ม (เบิ้ม))
 2022 Pong Lang Huk On Son (โปงลางฮักออนซอน) (/Ch.3) as 

Television series
 2004 Kru Wai Jai Rai (ครูไหวใจร้าย) (Broadcast Thai​ Television/Ch.3) as Keng (young) (เก่ง (ตอนเด็ก))
 2009  (สายลับเดอะซีรีส์ กับ 24 คดีสุดห้ามใจ) (/Ch.9) as Kha-nun 
 2010 Chocolate 5 Reudoo (ช็อกโกแลต 5 ฤดู) (/Ch.9) as Pib 
 2011 Muad Ohpas (หมวดโอภาส ตอน บัวขวัญเธออยู่ไหน) (/Ch.9) as (Invited actor) 
 2013  (My Melody 360 องศารัก) (/Ch.9) as Jack 
 2013 ATM 2: Koo ver Error Er Rak (ATM 2 คู่เว่อ..เออเร่อ..เออรัก) (GDH 559/Ch.9) as Paed 
 2013  (แจ๊ค เดอะสายลับ (GTH side stories)) (/One 31) as Jack 
 2016 Gasohug (แก๊สโซฮัก..รักเต็มถัง) (GDH 559/Line TV) as 
 2017 Teenage Mom: The Series (คุณแม่วัยใส The Series) (GMM Grammy-GMMTV-Line TV/One 31) as Pose (Guest role) 
 2017 Diary Tootsies The Series Season 2 (ไดอารี่ตุ๊ดซี่ส์ เดอะ ซีรีส์ ซีซั่น 2) (GDH 559/GMM 25) as (Guest role) 
 2019 Likit Cheewit Ep.5 Jone Jai Barb (ลิขิตชีวิต ตอนที่ 5 โจรใจบาป) (/Ch.8) as Pong 
 2019 Sucker Kick (Sucker Kick สู้ตาย!! นายกระจับ) (/LINE TV) as Sa-Tad (สตั๊ด) 
 2020 Kit Hot Tai Baan Esan (คิดฮอดไทบ้าน อีสานซีรีส์) (/GMM 25) as Jo (โจ้)
 2021 Girl2K (สาวออฟฟิศ 2000 ปี) (The One Enterprise-GMMTV/GMM 25) as Oab with Passakorn Ponlaboon

Television sitcom
 2007 Bannee Merak (บ้านนี้มีรัก ตอนที่ 00 ชอบโยนความผิดให้คนอื่น) (/Ch.9) as Ar-Non (Mee-Pu) (อานนท์ (หมีพู) (รับเชิญ)) 
 2010  (เนื้อคู่ประตูถัดไป) (GMM Tai Hub/Ch.5) as Chatree Payakorn (ชาตรี พยากรณ์)
 2010  (เนื้อคู่อยากรู้ว่าใคร) (GMM Tai Hub/Ch.5) as Chatree Payakorn (ชาตรี พยากรณ์)
 2010  (ระเบิดเถิดเทิง ลั่นทุ่ง) (Workpoint Entertainment/Ch.5) as Lam (หลาม)
 201ุ6 Ha Unlimited (2015) (บริษัทฮาไม่จำกัด) (ZENSE Entertainment/Mono 29) as 
 2017 Khunjai Thailand (ขวัญใจไทยแลนด์) (/Workpoint TV) as Nam-Pu (น้ำพุ)
 2018  (สภากาแฟ 4.0) (Amarin Group/Amarin TV) as Kob (ก็อบ)
 2018  (คิดดีคลินิก) (GDH 559/PPTVHD36) as Job (จ็อบ)
 2019 Yam Puan Guan Hua Jai (ยามป่วนกวนหัวใจ) (Mongkoldee Production/Ch.7) as Tony (โทนี่)
 2020  (เสือ ชะนี เก้ง 2020 ฤดูกาลที่ 5 ตอนที่ 00) (The One Enterprise/One 31) as Yod (ยศ (รับเชิญ))

Music video

MC 
Television
 2016  (ตื่นมาคุย) (/Ch.9) (2016)
 2018  (Davinci เกมถอดรหัส) (SEARCH Entertainment, CLICK CREATIVE/Ch.3) (2018-2019)
 2021  (แฉ) (/GMM 25) (2021-)
 2021  (Atime Showcaze) (A Time Media/A Time Media) (2021-)
 2021  (ฮัลโหลซุปตาร์พาเที่ยว) (/Ch.7) (2021-)
 2023 Late Night Game (Mainstand Creator (Thailand)/Ch.9) With Yuthana Boonorm, Kapol Thongplub, Kiattisak Udomnak, Jittakorn Srikhamkhrua, Suvinai Potipairoad Every Monday and Tuesday from 10:30 PM to 11:30 PM (starting Monday, February 6, 2023-)

Online
 2021  (แจ็คขอคุย) (YouTube:Jackfanchan) 
 2021  (ขอของดารา EP.1) (YouTube:Jackfanchan) 
 2021  (แฟนฉัน 1 คืน - EP.1) (YouTube:Jackfanchan)

Discography

Songs

Live shows

Stage play

Concert 

 STAR THEQUE GTH 11 years (2015)

References 

1989 births
Living people
Chaleumpol Tikumpornteerawong
Chaleumpol Tikumpornteerawong
Chaleumpol Tikumpornteerawong
Chaleumpol Tikumpornteerawong
Chaleumpol Tikumpornteerawong
Chaleumpol Tikumpornteerawong
Chaleumpol Tikumpornteerawong
Chaleumpol Tikumpornteerawong
Chaleumpol Tikumpornteerawong
Chaleumpol Tikumpornteerawong
Chaleumpol Tikumpornteerawong